Phosphatidylinositol-4,5-bisphosphate 3-kinase catalytic subunit beta isoform is an enzyme that in humans is encoded by the PIK3CB gene.

Phosphoinositide 3-kinases (PI3Ks) phosphorylate the 3-prime OH position of the inositol ring of inositol lipids. They have been implicated as participants in signaling pathways regulating cell growth by virtue of their activation in response to various mitogenic stimuli. PI3Ks are composed of a 110-kD catalytic subunit, such as PIK3CB, and an 85-kD adaptor subunit (Hu et al., 1993).[supplied by OMIM]

References

Further reading